is the largest of the Kerama Islands, a group of Japanese islands southwest of Okinawa in the Pacific Ocean. The island is administered as the village of Tokashiki in Shimajiri District, Okinawa Prefecture, Japan.

Geography

Tokashiki is a hilly island of about 15.29 square kilometers with sheer cliffs which descend down to the seas.

Climate
The climate is warm year-round with a daily mean of 21 Celsius. It has 1,938 hours of sunshine per year, but it can get cloudy in December through February.

References

Islands of Okinawa Prefecture
Kerama Islands